Georgia has submitted twenty films for Oscar consideration in the Academy Award for Best International Feature Film category since gaining its independence from the USSR in 1991. Georgia received an Oscar nomination for its first-ever submission, A Chef in Love.

Submissions
The Academy of Motion Picture Arts and Sciences has invited the film industries of various countries to submit their best film for the Academy Award for Best Foreign Language Film since 1956. The Foreign Language Film Award Committee oversees the process and reviews all the submitted films. Following this, they vote via secret ballot to determine the five nominees for the award. This is the list of Georgian submissions for consideration to the American Academy of Motion Picture Arts and Sciences in the Best Foreign Film category.

A Georgian film, Repentance, was nominated by the Soviet Union in 1987. Since achieving independence from the Soviet Union, Georgia has submitted a total of thirteen films since their debut in 1996.

Bittersweet comedies directed by Nana Dzhordzhadze, a Georgian director now based in France, have been submitted twice. A Chef in Love starred French actor Pierre Richard as a renowned French chef who falls in love with a Georgian princess while travelling through the Caucasus in the turbulent 1920s. The film succeeded in getting Georgia's first-ever Oscar nomination. 27 Missing Kisses was a comedy-drama set in a small Georgian village focusing on the love triangle that develops between a pretty teenage girl, the older man with whom she falls in love, and the man's teenage son who loves the girl. Both films were co-productions with France and Pierre Richard also had a supporting role in Kisses. Kisses was considered a dark horse contender for an Oscar nomination, but did not make the final five.

Neither Here Comes the Dawn, a psychological thriller about a politician who flees his wartorn country with his desperately ill child, nor Migration of the Angel, an abstract and allegorical film featuring a number of characters waiting in an underground shopping mail for trains that never seem to come, made a dent on the international film festival circuit. From the same arthouse genre of filmmaking came Tbilisi, Tbilisi, a dark drama about an impoverished, alcoholic filmmaker in the Georgian capital, which was featured at a number of international festivals including Cannes and Stockholm.

In 2007, Georgia selected Russian Triangle, a thriller set in a large unnamed Russian city in which a mixed Russian-Georgian investigator deals with a blind serial killer, Chechen refugees and widespread organized crime. The film won the award for Best CIS/Baltic Film at the 2008 Nika Awards. For the first time, Georgia chose a film which was almost completely in Russian dialogue. In 2008, mystery-thriller Mediator starring an international cast from the UK, Germany, Russia as well as Georgia was selected. It too, was not a Georgian language film.

In 2009, The Other Bank, a film about an ethnic Georgian family separated by the war in Abkhazia, from the young son's point of view, represented Georgia in the foreign film race.

In addition to the films listed above, Georgian director Tengiz Abuladze's Georgian-language drama Repentance was selected to represent the Soviet Union in 1987 to compete for the 1988 Oscar. Although the film received a Golden Globe nomination, it did not make the final five at the Oscars.

A Chef in Love and 27 Missing Kisses were released in English-subtitled versions in some territories.

Notes

a: Each year is linked to an article about that particular year in film history.

See also
List of Soviet submissions for the Academy Award for Best International Feature Film

References

External links
 Georgian Film Center

Best Foreign Language Film Academy Award submissions by country
Academy Award